The 1990 Porsche Tennis Grand Prix was a women's tennis tournament played on indoor carpet courts at the Filderstadt Tennis Centre in Filderstadt, Germany and was part of the Tier II of the 1990 WTA Tour. It was the 13th edition of the tournament and was held from 15 October to 21 October 1990. Second-seeded Mary Joe Fernández won the singles title.

Finals

Singles
 Mary Joe Fernández defeated  Barbara Paulus 6–1, 6–3
 It was Fernández' 2nd singles title of the year and of her career.

Doubles
 Mary Joe Fernández /  Zina Garrison defeated  Mercedes Paz /  Arantxa Sánchez Vicario 7–5, 6–3

References

External links
 Official website 
 ITF tournament edition details

Porsche Tennis Grand Prix
Porsche Tennis Grand Prix
Porsche Tennis Grand Prix
1990s in Baden-Württemberg
Porsche Tennis Grand Prix
Porsch